Ali Ansarian (5 July 1977 – 3 February 2021) was an Iranian professional footballer, actor and presenter. His uncle, Hossein, is a famous Shia cleric.

Club career
After playing for Persepolis F.C. for several seasons, in July 2006 Ansarian joined the club's fierce rival, Esteghlal F.C. On 22 July 2007, he signed with Azadegan League Steel Azin F.C. for reportedly $150,000. After one season playing in a lower league, he returned to Iran Pro League.

International career
Ansarian had a few short call-ups to the national team. He made his debut for Iran in October 1998 against Kuwait.

Death
After struggling almost two weeks with COVID-19 and suffering from medical side effects and organ failures, Ansarian died at Farhikhtegan Hospital in Tehran on 3 February 2021, at age 43.

Career statistics

Honours
Persepolis
Iranian Football League (3): 1998–99, 1999–2000, 2001–02
Hazfi Cup (1): 1998–99

Shahin Bushehr
Hazfi Cup: runner-up 2012

Filmography

Film

Television

Home-video series

TV programs 
 Zabiwaka (2016) AIO Internet TV
 Varzeshgah (2017) Channel Five
 Mench Competition (2009) Channel Five
 Panorama Internet Program (2020)

Award
 V.i.Z. Film Fest (2021): Best Actor, win, for his role in Koolbarf

References

External links
 Instagram page
 
 

1977 births
2021 deaths
Iranian footballers
Persian Gulf Pro League players
Azadegan League players
Esteghlal F.C. players
Gostaresh Foulad F.C. players
Persepolis F.C. players
Shahin Bushehr F.C. players
Shahrdari Tabriz players
Esteghlal Ahvaz players
Iran international footballers
Association football defenders
Iranian radio and television presenters
Deaths from the COVID-19 pandemic in Iran
21st-century Iranian male actors